James Bezan  (born May 19, 1965) is a Conservative Canadian politician who has represented the riding of Selkirk—Interlake—Eastman (formerly Selkirk—Interlake) in the House of Commons of Canada since 2004. He is currently the Conservative Shadow Minister for National Defence.

Early life and career
Bezan was born May 19, 1965 in Russell, Manitoba Bezan majored in livestock technology in Olds College's Agricultural Production program. Bezan worked in the livestock and cattle industries in the 1980s and 1990s, and started his own company in 1996. He served as Chief Executive Officer of the Manitoba Cattle Producer's Association, and has sat on boards in the fields of cattle and food production. He also operates a family farm near Teulon, Manitoba.

Federal politics
Bezan was first elected in the riding of Selkirk—Interlake in the 2004 federal election, and was re-elected in the 2006, 2008, 2011, 2015, 2019 federal elections and 2021 federal elections.

In opposition, Bezan served on the executive of the Canada-Europe Parliamentary Association, and as the Conservative Associate Agriculture Critic.

In the 38th Canadian Parliament, Bezan tabled Motion, M-309 which sought to increase benefits for parents of critically ill children. This motion became law within Government Bill C-44 in 2012 which proposes a new Employment Insurance (EI) special benefit for parents who take time off work to care for their critically ill or injured children.

In government 
In the 2006 federal election, Bezan was re-elected, defeating former Manitoba premier and Governor General of Canada Ed Schreyer, who ran for the New Democratic Party

Between 2006-2015 as a member of government, Bezan has served as Chair of the Standing Committee on Agriculture and Agri-Food; Chair of the Standing Committee on Environment and Sustainable Development; Chair of the Manitoba Conservative Caucus; Chair of the Canadian Section of the Inter-Parliamentary Forum of the Americas (FIPA); and Secretary of the Canada-Ukraine Parliamentary Friendship Group.

Bezan has advocated marketing choice for Western Canadian grain farmers and fishermen. As a longtime and outspoken opponent of the long-gun registry, Bezan was pleased when the registry was ended. Bezan has also been instrumental in securing over $35 million in funding for the Lake Winnipeg Basin Initiative in Budgets 2007 and 2012.

In the 39th Canadian Parliament, Bezan passed Private Member's Bill C-459, which established the Ukrainian Famine and Genocide Memorial Day and recognizes the Ukrainian Famine of 1932-33, the Holodomor, as an act of genocide. Bezan was awarded the Order of Prince Yaroslav the Wise, Ukraine's highest civilian award, by the President of Ukraine.

Bezan's wife Kelly has survived melanoma skin cancer on a number of occasions.  Bezan, who also used artificial tanning equipment, tabled a Private Member's Bill, C-497 in the 40th Canadian Parliament, to strengthen warning labelling on tanning beds on the carcinogenic risks from radiation caused by tanning equipment.

In first session of the 41st Parliament, Bezan served as the Chair of the Standing Committee on National Defence, and was elected as the Vice President of the Canada-Ukraine Parliamentary Friendship Group and executive member for the Canadian Section of ParlAmericas. During the 41st Parliament, Bezan founded and co-chairs the Canadian Parliamentarians for Democracy and Human Rights in Iran, which is an all-party group.

In the 41st Canadian Parliament, Bezan introduced two pieces of legislation. The first was Tanning Equipment Prohibition and Warning (Cancer Risks) Act (Bill C-386). This Bill influenced the Government to put warning labels about the health risks of indoor tanning on tanning equipment in February 2013. In February 2013, Bezan tabled Bill C-478, The Respecting Families of Murdered and Brutalized Persons Act. This Bill seeks to extend the parole eligibility period for those convicted of the abduction, sexual assault and murder of an individual.

On September 19, 2013, Bezan was appointed by Prime Minister Stephen Harper as the Parliamentary Secretary to the Minister of National Defence. He began the 2nd session of the 41st Parliament with this role.

While serving in Her/His Majesty's Loyal Opposition since 2015, Bezan has served as the Shadow Minister for National Defence, the Deputy Official Opposition Whip, Co-coordinator for Question Period Planning and Shadow Minister for Ethics.

Throughout his time in Parliament, Bezan has worked on Ukrainian and Iranian human rights and democracy issues. Bezan travelled with Prime Minister Harper to the Ukraine in 2010 and 2015 and has served as an election monitor in the last four Ukrainian elections. Bezan lobbied to have the Iranian embassy shut down and have the MeK delisted as a terrorist organization. Both of these actions by Bezan were acted upon by the Government of Canada during the 41st Canadian Parliament.

Bezan was one of thirteen Canadians banned from traveling to Russia under retaliatory sanctions imposed by Russian President Vladimir Putin in March 2014. He replied through his official Twitter feed, "Sanctions by Russia will not silence me standing up for Ukraine. This is a badge of honour for all critics of the Crimea Invasion."

Elections Canada dispute
The Speaker of the House of Commons received a request from Elections Canada to suspend Bezan as a member of Parliament (MP) in June 2013 over an alleged failure to properly claim the cost of advertising signage he erected while MP. The Speaker made a ruling on June 18, 2013, in response to a question of privilege, to have the Standing Committee on Procedure and House Affairs (PROC) review this issue. On February 5, 2014, Bezan and Elections Canada came to an agreement on a corrected campaign return. In a statement on his website, he said: 
I am pleased to say that Elections Canada has agreed with the commercial value of my MP signs I submitted in my corrected campaign return on May 5, 2013 at $518 per sign.  My final campaign return for the 2011 election is below the allowable election expense limit, and my personal contributions are also below the allowable limit. As a matter of fact, the total difference between my corrected return filed on May 5, 2013 and my final return is only $458."

Electoral record

References

External links
 Official site
 How'd They Vote?: James Bezan's voting history and quotes

1965 births
Living people
Farmers from Manitoba
Members of the House of Commons of Canada from Manitoba
Conservative Party of Canada MPs
Canadian people of Ukrainian descent
21st-century Canadian politicians
Canadian ranchers
Canadian Baptists